The term dispenser typically imply a machine or container which is designed to release a specific amount of its content, usually liquids or powders/fine granular materials.

In common usage, a dispenser may also refer to:

Devices

Candy
 Klik Rockets Dispenser, a candy dispenser
 Pez dispenser, a candy dispenser

Hygiene
 Automatic toothpaste dispenser, a device used to contain and dispense toothpaste
 Paper-towel dispenser, a device that dispenses paper towels
 Soap dispenser, a device that, when manipulated or triggered appropriately, yields soap
Hand sanitizer  dispenser, a device that gives out hand sanitiser

Medicine
 
 
 Dispenser (prescription), a health professional who makes up prescriptions, such as a pharmacist or a pharmaconomist
 Hearing aid dispenser, an entity that sells hearing aid
 Pill dispenser, items which release medication at specified times

Others
 
 Cash dispenser, Device used to process cash present operation in  automated teller machine (ATM)
 Label dispenser, machines built to simplify the process of removing a label from its liner or backing tape
 Media dispenser, a device for dispensing small units of liquid laboratory media
 Powder measure, a device for dispensing uniform amounts from a propellant hopper while handloading small arms ammunition
 Tape dispenser, an object that holds a roll of tape and has a mechanism at one end to shear the tape
 Vending machines, which dispense beverages, candy, chips, sandwiches, and other foods
 Water dispenser, a device designed to dispense hot or cold water
 Wine dispenser, a device designed to serve and preserve wines
 An automated dispenser used for order picking in warehouses

People
 Le Despenser, a surname, most commonly associated with Norman-English barons

See also
 
 
 Dispensation (disambiguation)
 Dispensor (Transformers), fictional robot
 Dispensing (disambiguation)